Helen Molyneux is a Welsh lawyer who founded and was the CEO of the UK personal injury law firm NewLaw Solicitors.

Life and career 
Molyneux was born March 1965, in the Welsh town of Caerphilly. She studied law at Cardiff University and qualified as a solicitor in 1991.

On 24 April 2012 her firm Newlaw became the 1st Welsh and 4th overall practice to be licensed as an ABM by the Solicitors Regulation Authority. Molyneux's idea originated when she met a gentleman on a train from London, talking about the insurance market as he owned an insurance brokers. They came up with the idea of creating a law firm that manages personal injury claims from insurance companies and brokers.

In 2013, Molyneux was named Law Society Business Women of the year for employing over 470 people in the UK, turning over £35m annually in work with leading consumer brands s.

Awards/Achievements (Personal and Business)

References 

Living people
Welsh businesspeople
Welsh lawyers
Year of birth missing (living people)